Degia deficiens is a moth in the Psychidae family. It is found on Sarawak and the Philippines (Palawan).

Subspecies
Degia deficiens deficiens (Sarawak)
Degia deficiens palawanensis Sobczyk, 2009 (Palawan)

References

Natural History Museum Lepidoptera generic names catalog

Psychidae
Taxa named by Francis Walker (entomologist)
Moths described in 1862